Linus Höglund (born 25 March 1997), better known as Hogland, is a Swedish music producer, DJ and songwriter.

He started his career in 2015 with his first song "The Night", which placed itself in the top 3 of the Swedish Spotify Viral 50 list. During the summer of 2019 he released the song "Letting Go" together with the singer KIDDO. The song reached the Swedish Top 50 Chart on Spotify as well as reaching Sverigetopplistan for a total of 13 weeks. "Letting Go" gained international attention when Kygo started to play the song during his own gigs. Hogland has now amassed over 130 million streams on Spotify, and has been IFPI certifield gold in Sweden.

Discography 
Singles

References

External links 
 Official website

1997 births
21st-century Swedish male musicians
21st-century Swedish musicians
Electro house musicians
Electronic dance music DJs
Musicians from Stockholm
Progressive house musicians
Remixers
Swedish dance musicians
Swedish DJs
Swedish electronic musicians
Swedish house musicians
Swedish record producers
Living people